The Chicago Loop may refer to:

Chicago Loop, local name for the historical center of downtown Chicago
Chicago Loop (plumbing), alternate name of a kitchen island sink waste plumbing installation
The Loop (rapid transit)
Chicago Loop (band), a 1960s rock group
Chicago Loop (film), a 1976 short film by James Benning (film director)
Chicago Loop (novel), a novel by Paul Theroux